The 1948 Cork Senior Football Championship was the 60th staging of the Cork Senior Football Championship since its establishment by the Cork County Board in 1887. 

Clonakilty entered the championship as the defending champions.

On 31 October 1948, Millstreet won the championship following a 1-02 to 0-03 defeat of St. Vincent's in the final at the Cork Athletic Grounds. It remains their only championship title.

Results

Final

Miscellaneous

 Millstreet win their first,and to date only, title.
 St. Vincent's qualify for the final for the first time.

References

Cork Senior Football Championship